John Carmichael, 3rd Earl of Hyndford  (15 March 1701 – 19 July 1767), styled Lord Carmichael between 1710 and 1737, was a Scottish nobleman and diplomat.

Life
He was son of James Carmichael, 2nd Earl of Hyndford and succeeded to the earldom in 1737. He was a Scottish representative peer from 1739 and sheriff of Lanark from 1739, Lord High Commissioner to the General Assembly of the Church of Scotland in 1739 and 1740. He was appointed a Knight of the Thistle in 1742 and a Privy Counsellor in 1750. He was Vice Admiral of Scotland from 1764 to 1767.

He was envoy to Prussia from 1741 to 1742, to Russia from 1744 to 1749 and to Vienna from 1752 to 1764.

He was succeeded by John Carmichael, the son of his uncle, William Carmichael of Skirling.

References
 The Scottish Peerage

External links

1701 births
1767 deaths
Diplomatic peers
Earls of Hyndford
Members of the Privy Council of Great Britain
Ambassadors of Great Britain to Russia
Knights of the Thistle
Lords High Commissioner to the General Assembly of the Church of Scotland
Scottish representative peers
Ambassadors of Great Britain to the Holy Roman Emperor